Cléverson Gabriel Córdova (born 9 August 1985), commonly known as Cléo, is a former Brazilian professional footballer who played as a striker. He also holds Serbian citizenship.

While playing on three different continents, Cléo scored at least once in the major club international competitions, in the Copa Libertadores for Atlético Paranaense, in the UEFA Champions League for Partizan, and in the AFC Champions League for two clubs, Guangzhou Evergrande and Kashiwa Reysol.

Club career

Early career
Born in Guarapuava, Cléo started out with local club Batel, before joining Comercial-PR. He was later spotted by Olivais e Moscavide, which brought him to Portugal in the summer of 2004. Six months later, Cléo returned to Brazil and signed for Atlético Paranaense, playing with them in the 2005 and 2006 Campeonato Brasileiro Série A. He also made three appearances in the 2005 Copa Libertadores, scoring once against Paraguayan side Cerro Porteño. Meanwhile, Cléo spent some time on loan at Ferroviária and Figueirense in 2005. In the summer of 2006, Cléo returned to Olivais e Moscavide, staying there for the next two seasons.

In August 2008, Cléo moved to Serbian club Red Star Belgrade, on a one-year loan with a view to a permanent move. He was given the number 17 shirt. During a turbulent period for the club, Cléo managed to score 12 goals in 24 appearances (league and cup) that season. He eventually left Red Star after the club was not able to pay a transfer fee of €800,000.

Partizan

2009–10 season
On 19 June 2009, Cléo signed a four-year contract with Partizan, becoming the first player to join the club from arch-rivals Red Star in more than 20 years (the last was Goran Milojević in 1988). He scored on his official debut for Partizan on 14 July and helped his team to a 4–0 away win over Welsh champions Rhyl in the first match of the 2009–10 UEFA Champions League second qualifying round. Seven days later, Cléo netted a hat-trick in the return leg, opening his tally in an 8–0 victory with a bicycle kick. He also scored from a penalty in a 1–1 home draw with Slovak side MŠK Žilina in the first leg of the 2009–10 UEFA Europa League play-off round. On 28 November, Cléo scored a goal against his former club to help Partizan beat Red Star 2–1. He appeared regularly in the second part of the 2009–10 Serbian SuperLiga, adding nine goals in 14 games, and helped Partizan clinch their third consecutive title. In total, Cléo was the club's top scorer with 22 goals in all competitions, one more than Senegalese striker Lamine Diarra, who left the club at the end of the season.

2010–11 season
On 14 July 2010, Cléo opened the season by scoring the third goal in his team's 3–1 victory over Armenian champions Pyunik in the first leg of the 2010–11 UEFA Champions League second qualifying round. A week later in Yerevan in the second meeting, Cléo scored a goal from the edge of the penalty area in the fifth minute of injury time in the first half, thus leading his team to the next round with a total score of 4–1 on aggregate. In the first match of the third qualifying round, Cléo scored in the 90th minute for his team's 3–0 win against Finland's HJK. Subsequently, Cléo netted both goals in the team's 2–1 return leg victory. He also scored a goal in the first round of the 2010–11 Serbian SuperLiga against Inđija at home, thus continued his series of goals. On 18 August, in the play-off round first leg against Anderlecht, a game which ended 2–2, Cléo scored his seventh goal in six matches. Six days later, on 24 August, Cléo scored twice against Anderlecht in the return tie, bringing his tally to nine goals in seven matches in the season. He was also accurate in the penalty shoot-out, and so helped Partizan reach the Champions League for the first time in seven years. On 4 September, Cléo scored his 10th goal in the season with an overhead bicycle kick in the match against Hajduk Kula. On 28 September, in the second round of the Champions League group stage, Cléo completed one of two penalties in a 3–1 defeat versus Arsenal. On 8 December, again in a match against Arsenal, Cléo scored an equalizer at Emirates Stadium, however Partizan lost the game 3–1. He was voted as the club's Player of the Year in 2010 by the fans.

Guangzhou Evergrande

2011 season
On 12 February 2011, Cléo completed his move to Chinese Super League side Guangzhou Evergrande, signing a four-year deal. At the time, this move set a new record of Chinese football with €3.2 million ($4.5 million) transfer fee. He made his league debut for Guangzhou against Dalian Shide on 2 April and scored the winning goal in the match. Cléo started the season by scoring five goals in his first five league appearances. However, Cléo suffered a muscular strain in leg during a FA Cup match against Guizhou Zhicheng on 4 May, ruling him out for two months. On 26 June, after recovering from injury, Cléo entered from the bench at the half and scored a penalty in the 60th minute against Jiangsu Sainty. He scored another four goals in the next four matches, but the recurrence of a leg strain in a match against Nanchang Hengyuan on 14 July ruled him out for a further two months. Cléo returned to training in late August but got injured again in early September. The lingering injury kept him out of the field for the second half of the year. He managed to score 10 times in 10 appearances during the 2011 league season.

2012 season
After the end of the 2011 season, it was reported that Guangzhou had decided to give up Cléo for his lingering injury. He was linked with France's Ligue 1 side Marseille and another Super League club Guizhou Renhe. However, Cléo eventually stayed in Guangzhou for the 2012 season.

On 25 February 2012, Cléo scored both goals for Guangzhou in the 2012 Chinese FA Super Cup, a 2–1 victory over Tianjin Teda, which ensured Guangzhou win this trophy for the first time in the club's history. He continued his goalscoring form into the AFC Champions League, netting a brace in the first match of the group stage, as Guangzhou trashed K League champions Jeonbuk Hyundai Motors 5–1 on 7 March. On 15 May, during Guangzhou's last group stage match of the Champions League against Buriram United, Cléo earned a penalty in the 90th minute, which Darío Conca converted into the winning goal. Guangzhou beat Buriram United 2–1 and sealed a place in the knockout phase for the Chinese Super League side. On 30 May, Cléo scored the winning goal during the round of 16 in the AFC Champions League, as Guangzhou beat J1 League side FC Tokyo 1–0 and became the first Chinese club to reach the quarter-finals of the competition since 2006. Although scoring four goals in seven matches, Cléo was replaced by newcomer Lucas Barrios in the 30-man squad which was submitted for the next stage of the Champions League. On 18 August, in an interview after a league match against Changchun Yatai, in which Cléo scored a goal and made an assist to help Guangzhou to a 2–1 win, Cléo stated his disappointment with the club's decision to exclude him from the Champions League squad and would seek a transfer at the end of the season. Cléo played as a regular starter in the domestic competitions and helped Guangzhou Evergrande win their second Super League championship and first FA Cup title.

Loan to Kashiwa Reysol
On 25 January 2013, Cléo moved to Japanese club Kashiwa Reysol on a one-year loan deal. He made 27 appearances and scored nine goals in the 2013 J.League Division 1. In November, Cléo was diagnosed with appendicitis and his loan spell was cut short by the Japanese club. He then returned to Guangzhou Evergrande and was released in early 2014.

Return to Atlético Paranaense
After leaving Asia, Cléo returned to his homeland and started training with his former club Atlético Paranaense in May 2014. He signed a permanent contract shortly after. On 29 May, Cléo made his second debut for the club in a 2–2 home draw with São Paulo. He stepped on the pitch in the 77th minute and managed to score little more than 10 minutes later with a volley kick. Throughout the 2014 Brasileirão, Cléo appeared in 20 games and scored nine times, making him the team's highest scorer that year.

Later career
On 29 February 2016, Cléo signed a contract with Série B club Goiás, being officially presented two days later. He scored a hat-trick in his team's 5–3 success against Trindade, helping the side win the Campeonato Goiano the same year.

In August 2017, Cléo returned to Portugal and signed with newly promoted LigaPro club Cova da Piedade on a one-year deal. He was the team's top scorer in the 2017–18 season with 12 goals in all competitions.

In July 2018, Cléo signed with China League One club Qingdao Huanghai, returning to Chinese football after six years. He was the team's top scorer over the next two seasons, helping them win the 2019 China League One and get promotion to the Chinese Super League for the first time in history.

International career
In August 2010, Cléo expressed his desire to play for the Serbia national team. He applied for Serbian citizenship the following month after meeting with Ivica Dačić, the Minister of Internal Affairs. On 23 September 2010, Cléo became a citizen of Serbia.

However, Cléo never received a call-up for the Serbia national team, failing to satisfy a 5-year residency requirement.

Statistics

Honours

Club
Partizan
 Serbian SuperLiga: 2009–10
Guangzhou Evergrande
 Chinese Super League: 2011, 2012
 Chinese FA Cup: 2012
 Chinese FA Super Cup: 2012
Kashiwa Reysol
 J.League Cup: 2013
Goiás
 Campeonato Goiano: 2016
Qingdao Huanghai
 China League One: 2019

Individual
 Serbian Cup Top Scorer: 2008–09
 FK Partizan Player of the Year: 2010
 Chinese FA Super Cup Most Valuable Player: 2012

References

External links

 
 
 
 

Associação Ferroviária de Esportes players
Association football forwards
Brazilian expatriate footballers
Brazilian expatriate sportspeople in China
Brazilian expatriate sportspeople in Japan
Brazilian expatriate sportspeople in Portugal
Brazilian expatriate sportspeople in Serbia
Brazilian footballers
Campeonato Brasileiro Série A players
Campeonato Brasileiro Série B players
C.D. Cova da Piedade players
C.D. Olivais e Moscavide players
China League One players
Chinese Super League players
Club Athletico Paranaense players
Expatriate footballers in China
Expatriate footballers in Japan
Expatriate footballers in Portugal
Expatriate footballers in Serbia
Figueirense FC players
FK Partizan players
Goiás Esporte Clube players
Guangzhou F.C. players
J1 League players
Kashiwa Reysol players
Liga Portugal 2 players
Naturalized citizens of Serbia
People from Guarapuava
Qingdao F.C. players
Red Star Belgrade footballers
Serbian SuperLiga players
1985 births
Living people
Sportspeople from Paraná (state)